German submarine U-1198 was a Type VIIC U-boat of Nazi Germany's Kriegsmarine during World War II.

She was ordered on 25 August 1941, and was laid down on 13 March 1943 at F Schichau GmbH, Danzig, as yard number 1568. She was launched on 30 September 1943 and commissioned under the command of Oberleutnant zur See Gerhard Peters on 9 December 1943.

Design
German Type VIIC submarines were preceded by the shorter Type VIIB submarines. U-1198 had a displacement of  when at the surface and  while submerged. She had two shafts and two  propellers.

U-1198 was fitted with five  torpedo tubes (four fitted at the bow and one at the stern), fourteen torpedoes or 26 TMA mines, one  SK C/35 naval gun, (220 rounds), one  Flak M42 and two twin  C/30 anti-aircraft guns. The boat had a complement of between 44 — 52 men.

Service history
On 8 May 1945, U-1198 surrendered at Cuxhaven, Germany. She was later transferred to Loch Ryan, Scotland, from Wilhelmshaven on 24 June 1945. Of the 156 U-boats that eventually surrendered to the Allied forces at the end of the war, U-1198 was one of 116 selected to take part in Operation Deadlight. U-1198 was towed out on 17 December 1945, and sunk.

References

Bibliography

External links

German Type VIIC submarines
U-boats commissioned in 1943
World War II submarines of Germany
Ships built in Danzig
1943 ships
Maritime incidents in December 1945
Operation Deadlight
Ships built by Schichau